Hind Jamili (born 11 December 1998) is a Moroccan slalom canoeist who has competed since 2013.

She finished in 21st place in the K1 event at the 2016 Summer Olympics in Rio de Janeiro.

References

External links 
 Hind Jamili at CanoeSlalom.net
 
 
 
 

1998 births
Living people
Moroccan female canoeists
Olympic canoeists of Morocco
Canoeists at the 2016 Summer Olympics